Menes was a Pharaoh of ancient Egypt.

Menes may also refer to:

Places
 Ménes, the Hungarian name for Miniș village, Ghioroc Commune, Arad County, Romania

People

Given name
 Menes of Pella, a Macedonian general
 Saint Menes (285 – c. 309), Egyptian saint, and one of the most famous Christian saints, speculated to be the same person known as Saint Christopher

Surname
 Luis Menes, Mexican footballer
 Orlando Ricardo Menes, Latino poet

Fictional characters
 A character in the short story The Cats of Ulthar by H. P. Lovecraft

See also

 Mene (disambiguation)
 Menas (disambiguation)